Ethnogeology is the study of how geological features are understood by indigenous communities around the globe from a "place-based" perspective, in specific reference to traditional knowledge and to the stories and ideas about the Earth that were passed down through traditions and the wisdom of elders.  The focus in past research tended to be on the unique ideas and knowledge of minorities and distinct cultural groups, and how this relates to universal and cross cultural knowledge discovered by humanity as a whole.  Knowledge claims that are based more on universal discoveries and natural science can be found in the subjects of philosophy, chemistry, physics, biology, mathematics, and geology. The term "ethnogeology" first enters the geological literature through the work of John Murray of the University of Manitoba in Winnipeg, Canada in the mid-1990s by virtue of his studies of the Northern Cree First Nation geological worldviews in the Province of Manitoba in Canada. At that time, a cadre of geologists and geoscience educators - particularly Dr. Steven Semken of Navajo Community College in Shiprock, New Mexico and colleagues - were examining the interesting connections among Native American traditional knowledge, geoscience concepts, and the unique vision of planet Earth's history as articulated by indigenous ethnogeological wisdom (see references below).

One global example of geological knowledge over thousands of years is the making of rock tools and arrowheads.  Worldwide, humans have shaped specific kinds of rock into various tools.  These artifacts are evidence that there was some basic knowledge of which rocks were hard enough and easy enough to chip into various useful forms.  Ancient humans discovered certain rock formations that provided them with materials to work with.  Flint, obsidian, chert, copper and quartz were some examples of useful rocks or minerals for thousands of years.

In addition, humans have always used natural, high, and dry ridges for land transportation.  Natural water ways were used for boats, travel, exploration, and trade.  Various types of natural elements were used around the Earth for centuries.  Gold and silver are prized for jewelry and trade.  Good soil is needed for agriculture.  Mountains and rivers provided natural boundaries, defence, and borders for various political groups.

References 

Integration of Native American and Euro-American Culture and Science

Ambler, M., 1998, Land-based colleges offer science students a sense of place: Tribal College Journal, v. 10, no. 1, p. 6-8.
Arthur, C., Bingham, S., Bingham, J., and Rock Point Community School, 1994, Between sacred mountains: Tucson, University of Arizona Press, 288 p.
Atwater, M.M., 1993, Multicultural science education: assumptions and alternative views: The Science Teacher, v. 60, March, p. 33-37.
Barden, J., 1998, Cultural perspectives and the nature of science: Tribal College Journal, v. 10, no. 1, p. 38-39.
Bevier, M.L., Thompson, J.C., and Evenchick, C.A., 1997, Making geoscience relevant to First Nations students from the north coast of British Columbia: Journal of Geoscience Education, v. 45, p. 105-108.
Black, David W. and Lucy Wilson 1998 "History and Geology of the Washademoak Lake Chert Source, Queen's County, New Brunswick", invited paper, presented at the Geological Society of America, 33rd Annual Meeting, Northeastern Section; Theme Session: Archaeological Stone Artifacts: Contributions to Sources, Petrology and Distribution; GSA Abstracts with Programs, vol. 30, no. 1, February 1998. [edit]
Caduto, M.J., and Bruchac, J., 1988, Keepers of the Earth: Native American stories and environmental activities for children: Golden, Colorado, Fulcrum, Inc., 209 p.
Cajete, G.A., 1999, The Native American learner and bicultural science education, in Swisher, K.G., and Tippeconnic, J.W., III, eds., Next steps: research and practice to advance Indian education: Charleston, West Virginia, ERIC Clearinghouse on Rural Education and Small Schools, p. 135-160.
Dubiel, R.F., Hasiotis, S.T., and Semken, S.C., 1997, Hands-on geology for Navajo Nation teachers: Journal of Geoscience Education, v. 45, p. 113-116.
Garrison, E.R., Denetclaw, W.F., Jr., and Scott, O.T., 1995, Navajo scientists of the next century—laanaa hasin: Journal of Navajo Education, v. 12, p. 11-15.
Kawagley, A.O., and Barnhardt, R., 1999, Education indigenous to place: Western science meets Native reality, in Smith, G.A., and Williams, D.R., eds., Ecological education in action: on weaving education, culture, and the environment: Albany, State University of New York Press
McNeley, J.K., 1965, Immanent mind in Navajo philosophy and Batesonian holistic science: Born in 1908/Died in 1965; a longtime educator of Navajo history, who lived in Phoenix, AZ: him and his partner, Brendan Styles McNeley, had 3 children. A member of a Navajo gay rights group: J.K McNeley has been called by many Navajo people as a Modern Day Navajo Legend and Leader.  Diné be'iina'
Murphy, M.T., and Brown, V., 1996, Integration of Earth science and Native American culture: Geological Society of America Abstracts with Programs
Murray, J., 1996, Of pipestone, thunderbird nests, and ilmenite: ethnogeology, myth, and the renaming of a world: Geological Society of America Abstracts with Programs
Murray, J., 1997, Ethnogeology and its implications for the aboriginal geoscience curriculum: Journal of Geoscience Education
Ridgway, K., Dowse, M., Geary, E.E., Maxson, J., Semken, S., Stephenson-Hawk, D., and Winkler, J., 1996, How can we increase diversity, recruitment, and retention of students in the Earth and space sciences, in Ireton, M.F.W., Manduca, C.A., and Mogk, D.M., eds., Shaping the future of undergraduate Earth science education: innovation and change using an Earth system approach: Washington, American Geophysical Union,
 Riggs, E.M., 1998, Toward an understanding of the roles of scientific, traditional, and spiritual knowledge in our "demon-haunted world": American Indian Culture and Research Journal
 Riggs, E.M., and Marsh, D.G., 1998, The Indigenous Earth Sciences Project: exploring the synthesis of Southern California Native American traditional knowledge and the Earth sciences: GSA Today
 Semken, S. C., 1994, Hózhó and Hutton together: autochthonous geoscience education for Navajo students: Proceedings, American Geophysical Union Chapman Conference on the Scrutiny of Undergraduate Geoscience Education,
 Semken, S.C., 1997a, NAGT/GSA symposium on geoscience education in Native American communities: Journal of Geoscience Education,
 Semken, S.C., 1997b, Introduction to the geology and hydrogeology of northwestern New Mexico: Proceedings, 41st Annual New Mexico Water Conference, New Mexico Water Resources Research Institute, p. 13-21.
 Semken, S.C., Goldtooth-Semken, C., and Luna, L., 1996, The geology underlying conflicts over Native American lands in the western United States: Geological Society of America Abstracts with Programs, v. 28, p. A-399.
 Semken, S.C., and Morgan, F., 1997a, Navajo pedagogy and Earth systems: Journal of Geoscience Education, v. 45, p. 109-112.
 Semken, S.C., and Morgan, F., 1997b, Geology, Navajo knowledge, and a sense of place in the central Colorado Plateau: Geological Society of America Abstracts with Programs, v. 29, p. A-471.
 Semken, S.C., 1998, Rooted in the Earth: culturally-integrated, place-based teaching: Geological Society of America Abstracts with Programs, v. 30, p. A-246.
 Suzuki, D., and Knudtson, P., 1992, Wisdom of the elders: sacred Native stories of nature: New York, Bantam Books, 275 p.
Texier, P.-J., J.-P. Brugal, C. Lemorini and Lucy Wilson 1998 "Fonction d'un site du Paléolithique moyen en marge d'un territoire: l'abri de La Combette (Bonnieux, Vaucluse)" Economie préhistorique: les comportements de subsistence au Paléolithique, XVIIIè Rencontres Internationales d'Archéologie et d'Histoire d'Antibes, Editions APDCA, Sophia Antipolis, France; pp. 325–348.
Wilson, Lucy 2003 "Importance de la difficulté du terrain par rapport à la distance de transport dans les stratégies de circulation des matières premières lithiques dans le Vaucluse, au Paléolithique moyen" in Préhistoire du Sud-Ouest Supplément No. 5: Les Matières Premières Lithiques en Préhistoire - Table Ronde Internationale organisée à Aurillac (Cantal), du 20 au 22 juin 2002; pp. 343–349.
Wilson, Lucy 1986 "Hominid Lithic Raw Material Procurement Behaviour at the Caune de l'Arago, France" Symposium on Social and Economic Contexts of Technological Change, World Archaeology Congress; Southampton, England

See also 

archaeoastronomy
Indigenous peoples of the Americas
prehistory
oral history
songlines
stone tools

Ethnology
Subfields of geology